The Massacre of Mankind (2017) is a science fiction novel by British writer Stephen Baxter, a sequel to H. G. Wells' 1898 classic The War of the Worlds, authorised by the Wells estate. It is set in 1920, 13 years after the events of the original novel, as a second Martian invasion is chronicled by Miss Elphinstone, the ex-sister-in-law of the narrator of War of the Worlds. Baxter also wrote an authorised sequel to Wells' novel The Time Machine, called The Time Ships.

Plot summary
In New York City in 1920, four people sail to England to meet with Walter Jenkins, the original author of the War of the Worlds story. Jenkins has seen signs that the Martians may be planning a second attack. They arrive to find London has become a totalitarian dystopia and the whole country is gearing up for war. Walter's brother, Frank, is drafted the next day and London prepares for war. Beginning at 7:00 PM, 50 cylinder-shaped Martian missiles land on the city, wiping out nearly half of Britain's military. At midnight, another group of cylinders lands, this one carrying Martian warriors. The Martians emerge immediately- in contrast to the 19 hours required in their 1907 landings- and engage the British military with their heat rays. Army, Navy, and relatively new Air Force counterattacks prove mostly harmless against the Martian fighting-machines. Over the next several days, the Martians cripple London, carefully selecting targets of infrastructural importance, such as bridges, factories, and train stations. Many Londoners escape or take shelter.

Two years later, the Martians control England, though they mostly remain in their cordon. Walter Jenkins asks Julie Elphinstone, his former sister-in-law, to go into the Martian cordon to try to communicate with them. She and her group make the long journey to the cordon, dodging several Martian attacks along the way and meeting a saboteur named Marriott. At the Martian base, they discover that the Martians are cannibals, keeping humans and humanoid species in holding tanks for future harvesting. They witness breeding experiments between Martians and humans. Eventually they come to the feeding hole, where the Martians have humans hung upside-down from scaffolding while they inject the human's blood directly into their Martian bodies.

As the Martians continue to conquer other parts of Earth, Julie comes up with a plan. Knowing that the Martians communicate with their home planet by using sigils carved into the earth's surface, she wonders whether it would be possible to change the sigils and therefore disrupt communications. Eric Eden, a veteran of the first Martian war, agrees to let her attempt it. Eden transports Julie inside the cordon with his "landship," a massive tank-like vehicle the size of a battleship. Julie contacts the saboteur Marriott, who agrees to detonate numerous explosives to change the Martian sigils into the circular Jovian symbols. Within two hours, the Martians have withdrawn and the Jovians leave their circular sigil on the moon.

The book flashes forward 14 years. The Martians are still on Earth but no one knows where. Walter Jenkins takes Julie a half mile into the earth to the underground Martian city in England. He speculates that this is how they live on Mars, that they have no secrets because of their telepathy, and that they are all treated as equals. The British Martians built a space gun and shot themselves back to Mars. 

Reports say that other Martians moved to the Earth's poles where the climate is more Mars-like. Julie, Walter, Eric Eden, and some others take a massive German zeppelin to the arctic, where they see a Martian terraforming operation. Walter theorizes that with the Jovians watching, they are forced to colonize rather than conquer, and that humans should work with them instead of against.

When Earth-Mars opposition comes around again, the Martians do not launch any cylinders. The war of the worlds is over.

In addition to the main storyline, the novel contains various standalone vignettes depicting Martian attacks in New York City, Berlin, and Los Angeles.

See also

References

 

2017 British novels
Sequel novels
Novels by Stephen Baxter
Adaptations of works by H. G. Wells
War of the Worlds written fiction
Fiction set in 1920
Fiction set in 1922
Fiction set in 1936
Orion Books books